The 2002–03 UEFA Champions League second group stage matches took place between 26 November 2002 and 19 March 2003. The second group stage featured the eight group winners and eight group runners-up from the group stage. Each team was drawn into one of four groups, each of which featured three other clubs. All four teams in the group played home and away matches against each other to determine the winner and runner-up in the group.

At the completion of the second group stage, the top two teams in each group advanced to the quarter-finals, while the other two teams were eliminated from European competition.

Seeding structure

The winners of the first group stage groups are put into seeded pots 1 and 2 according to their UEFA coefficients. The four group-winners with the best coefficients will go into seed pot 1. The eight group runners-up will be put into seed pots 3 and 4 according to the same principle, i.e. the four clubs with the best coefficients will go into seed pot 3. One club from each seed pot will be drawn into each of the four groups. Clubs from the same association cannot be drawn into the same group and group-winners and runners-up from the same first-stage group will not be drawn into the same group again.

Tie-breaking criteria
Based on Article 7.06 in the UEFA regulations, if two or more teams are equal on points on completion of the group matches, the following criteria will be applied to determine the rankings:
higher number of points obtained in the group matches played among the teams in question;
superior goal difference from the group matches played among the teams in question;
higher number of goals scored away from home in the group matches played among the teams in question;
superior goal difference from all group matches played;
higher number of goals scored;
higher number of coefficient points accumulated by the club in question, as well as its association, over the previous five seasons.

Groups
Times are CET (UTC+1) as listed by UEFA (local times are in parentheses).

Group A

Group B

Group C

Group D

References

Group Stage 2
2002-03 2